John Mantle (13 March 1942 – 18 November 2018) was a Welsh dual-code international rugby player. He was capped for Wales at rugby union, and Great Britain and Wales in rugby league.

Personal

Education
He attended Bedwellty Grammar School, and later Loughborough College.

Rugby Union career
Mantle began his rugby career at a young age, playing for the Wales School team. As an adult he played with Bargoed before switching to first class team Newport.

International
While representing Newport, Mantle was selected for his two Welsh rugby union caps. His first was when he was selected as part of the touring Wales team to Africa. Mantle played in the early games of the tour, including wins over East Africa in Nairobi, and Boland at Wellington. His first international was against South Africa in Durban in 1964, but Wales were outclassed and lost 24-3 in a one-sided match. Mantle played in the later games on the tour, including matches against Northern Transvaal and Orange Free State. On his return he played one final game in a draw with England, at the Twickenham as part of the 1964 Five Nations Championship.

Wales rugby union
  1964
  1964

Rugby League career
Mantle may have won more caps for Wales, but 'Went North', switching to the professional rugby league code when he joined St. Helens (Heritage № 824) in 1964. He would later play for the Great Britain rugby league team. John Mantle played left-, i.e. number 8, in St. Helens' 2-25 defeat by the 1975 NSWRFL season premiers, Eastern Suburbs Roosters in the unofficial 1976 World Club Challenge at Sydney Cricket Ground on Tuesday 29 June 1976. After leaving St Helens, he went on to play for Salford, Leigh (Heritage № 870), Barrow, Keighley, Oldham RLFC (Heritage № 858) and finished his playing career at Blackpool Borough.

International games played
In rugby league Mantle was capped 13 times by Great Britain between 1966 and 1973, and won eight caps for Wales in 1975. He scored one try for Wales, giving him an overall total of 21 international rugby league appearances and three points.

Championship final appearances
John Mantle played  in St. Helens' 35-12 victory over Halifax in the Championship Final during the 1965–66 season at Station Road, Swinton on Saturday 28 May 1966, in front of a crowd of 30,165.

Challenge Cup Final appearances
John Mantle played  and scored a try in St. Helens' 21-2 victory over Wigan in the 1966 Challenge Cup Final during the 1965–66 season at Wembley Stadium, London on Saturday 21 May 1966, in front of a crowd of 98,536, and played left-, i.e. number 11, in the 16-13 victory over Leeds in the 1972 Challenge Cup Final during the 1971–72 season at Wembley Stadium, London on Saturday 13 May 1972, in front of a crowd of 89,495.

County Cup Final appearances
John Mantle played right-, i.e. number 12, in St. Helens' 2-2 draw with Warrington in the 1967 Lancashire County Cup Final during the 1967–68 season at Station Road, Swinton on Saturday 7 October 1967 (replaced by Kel Coslett in the replay), and played left-, i.e. number 11, in the 4-7 defeat by Leigh in the 1970 Lancashire County Cup Final during the 1970–71 season at Station Road, Swinton on Saturday 28 November 1970.

BBC2 Floodlit Trophy Final appearances
John Mantle played right-, i.e. number 12, in St. Helens' 0-4 defeat by Castleford in the 1965 BBC2 Floodlit Trophy Final during the 1965–66 season at Knowsley Road, St. Helens on Tuesday 14 December 1965, played left-, i.e. number 11, in St. Helens' 4-7 defeat by Wigan in the 1968 BBC2 Floodlit Trophy Final during the 1968-69 season at Central Park, Wigan on Tuesday 17 December 1968. played right- in the 5-9 defeat by Leeds in the 1970 BBC2 Floodlit Trophy Final during the 1970-71 season at Headingley Rugby Stadium, Leeds on Tuesday 15 December 1970, played right- in the 8-2 victory over Rochdale Hornets in the 1971 BBC2 Floodlit Trophy Final during the 1971-72 season at Headingley Rugby Stadium, Leeds on Tuesday 14 December 1971, and played left-, i.e. number 8, in the 22-2 victory over Dewsbury in the 1975 BBC2 Floodlit Trophy Final during the 1975-76 season at Knowsley Road, St. Helens on Tuesday 16 December 1975.

Coaching
He was head coach of Leigh and later the Cardiff City Blue Dragons.

He coached Wales for one fixture, along with Bill Francis, v England on 28 May 1978; England won 60-13.

Bibliography

References

External links
!Great Britain Statistics at englandrl.co.uk (statistics currently missing due to not having appeared for both Great Britain, and England)
Profile at saints.org.uk
Welsh convert XIII

1942 births
2018 deaths
Alumni of Loughborough University
Bargoed RFC players
Barrow Raiders players
Blackpool Borough players
Cardiff City Blue Dragons coaches
Dual-code rugby internationals
Great Britain national rugby league team players
Keighley Cougars players
Leigh Leopards captains
Leigh Leopards coaches
Leigh Leopards players
Loughborough Students RUFC players
Newport RFC players
Oldham R.L.F.C. players
Rugby league players from Cardiff
Rugby league centres
Rugby league locks
Rugby league props
Rugby league second-rows
Rugby league utility players
Rugby league wingers
Rugby union number eights
Rugby union players from Cardiff
Salford Red Devils players
St Helens R.F.C. players
Wales international rugby union players
Wales national rugby league team captains
Wales national rugby league team coaches
Wales national rugby league team players
Welsh rugby league players
Welsh rugby union players